Shadow Run is a 1998 crime film set in the south of England, United Kingdom. It is based on the novel by Desmond Lowden. It was not released in the cinema, and eventually appeared on home video in 2001.

Premise
Haskell (Michael Caine) is a hardened gangster assigned to a job by his boss, Landon-Higgins (James Fox), to steal sheets of watermarked paper to print fake money.

Cast
 Michael Caine as Haskell
 James Fox as Landon-Higgins
 Matthew Pochin as Joffrey
 Rae Baker as Julie
 Kenneth Colley as Larcombe
 Christopher Cazenove as Melchior
 Rupert Frazer as Maunder
 Leslie Grantham as Liney
 Tim Healy as Daltrey
 Emma Reeve as Victoria
 Katherine Reeve as Zee
 Angela Douglas as Bridget
 Maurice Thorogood as Walter
 Richard Tuck as Morton
 John Bray as Hallam
 Khan Bonfils as Baz

External links
 

1998 films
1998 crime films
1990s heist films
British crime films
British heist films
Films directed by Geoffrey Reeve
1990s English-language films
1990s British films